Lili Fa'aope (born 14 September 1964) is a former New Zealand rugby union player. She debuted for New Zealand in their first-ever match against a visiting California Grizzlies team at Christchurch. She featured at RugbyFest 1990 against the Netherlands and a World XV's team. She also made appearances for her Canterbury side at the festival.

On her maternal side Fa'aope is related to former All Black Olo Brown, Manu Samoa great Peter Fatialofa and New Zealand league internationals Jeremy Smith and Joe Vagana.

References 

1964 births
Living people
New Zealand female rugby union players
New Zealand women's international rugby union players